The tenga was the currency of Kokand until 1876. Silver tenga circulated with copper pul and gold tilla. There was no fixed relationship between the three denominations. The Russian ruble replaced the Pul, Tenga and Tilla.

References

Currencies of Asia
Modern obsolete currencies
Khanate of Kokand
1876 disestablishments